DéFI is a social-liberal, liberal, regionalist political party in Belgium mainly known for defending French-speakers’ interests in and near the Brussels region. The party is led by François de Smet, a member of the Chamber of Representatives. The party's current name, DéFI or Défi, was adopted in 2016 and is a backronym of Démocrate, Fédéraliste, Indépendant (literally, "Democratic, Federalist, Independent") meaning "challenge" in French.

History
The party was founded as the  Democratic Front of Francophones (Front Démocratique des Francophones, FDF) on 11 May 1964 as a response to the language laws of 1962. The party had instant success in Brussels: it first contested parliamentary elections one year later, where it won one senator and 3 seats in the Chamber of Representatives for the constituency of Brussels. Its number of seats increased further in the subsequent parliamentary elections. The party also dominated Brussels' municipal politics until 1982.

Initially the party cooperated with the Walloon Rally. From 1977 until 1980, the FDF participated in the federal governments led by Leo Tindemans and subsequently Wilfried Martens. From 1992, the FDF regularly competed in electoral alliance with the larger Liberal Reformist Party (PRL). In 2002 the PRL, the FDF, the MCC and the PFF formed the Reformist Movement (MR), a closer alliance of Francophone liberal parties.

In January 2010 the party name was amended to Francophone Democratic Federalists (Fédéralistes Démocrates Francophones), maintaining its original acronym. In September 2011, the FDF decided to leave the alliance over disagreements with MR president Charles Michel on the agreement concerning the splitting of the Brussels-Halle-Vilvoorde district during the 2010–2011 Belgian government formation.

The party adopted its current name, DéFI, in November 2015.

Policies
The party advocates the extension of the bilingual status of Brussels to some municipalities in the Brussels Periphery (in Flemish Brabant, Flemish Region), where a majority of the population is French-speaking, but the official language is Dutch, and pushes for the rights of French-speakers in Flemish municipalities to use French instead of Dutch in dealing with Dutch-speaking officials. Both stances are opposed by Flemish parties, who say that French-speaking residents of the Flemish Region should learn Dutch and argue that the Francization of Brussels should not further itself into the Region.

Representation
Notable elected members include:
 Véronique Caprasse, member of the Chamber of Representatives for Brussels and former mayor of Kraainem (2013–2015)
 Bernard Clerfayt, mayor of Schaerbeek since 2000 and member of the Brussels Parliament
 , Minister in the Vervoort II Brussels Government (2014–2019) and mayor of Auderghem
 Cécile Jodogne, Secretary of State in the Vervoort II Brussels Government (2014–2019)
 Olivier Maingain, former party leader, member of the Chamber of Representatives for Brussels since 1991 and mayor of Woluwe-Saint-Lambert since 2006

See also
 Belgian French
 French Community of Belgium
 Languages of Belgium

References

Bibliography

External links 

 

Centrist parties in Belgium
Francophone political parties in Belgium
Liberal parties in Belgium
Political parties established in 1964
1964 establishments in Belgium
Regionalist parties